Argyronympha is a genus of satyrid butterflies.

Species
Listed alphabetically:
Argyronympha gracilipes Jordan, 1924
Argyronympha pulchra Mathew, 1886
Argyronympha rubianensis Grose-Smith, 1889
Argyronympha ugiensis Mathew, 1886
Argyronympha ulava Grose-Smith, 1889

References

Satyrini
Butterfly genera